WKNL (100.9 FM, "100.9 K-Hits") is a radio station licensed to serve New London, Connecticut.  The station is owned by Hall Communications, Inc., which owns a number of stations in medium-sized markets along the eastern seaboard from Vermont to Florida.  It airs a classic hits music format.

History
WKNL signed on January 1, 1970, as WTYD, a beautiful music station branded as "Tide 101." At the outset, the station was owned by Thames Broadcasting Corporation, which also owned WNLC (1510 AM). Thames Broadcasting sold the stations to Mercury Broadcasting Corporation in 1976; in 1984, Mercury sold them to Drubner Broadcasting, which then sold WTYD and WNLC to Andross Communications in 1989. In 1990, WTYD shifted to an adult contemporary format.

Hall Communications purchased WTYD and WNLC in 1995. On March 10, 2000, Hall changed the station's format to oldies as "Kool 101," in response to WVVE (102.3 FM, now WMOS) dropping the format in December 1999; the WKNL call letters had been assigned on February 25, 2000. The oldies format (which subsequently shifted to classic hits) was dropped at midnight on December 17, 2012, when it changed to hot adult contemporary, branded as "100.9 Roxy FM"; at the time, sister station WNLC (98.7 FM) also programmed a classic hits format. The last song on "Kool 101" was "Last Dance" by Donna Summer with the first song on "100.9 Roxy FM" being "Some Nights" by Fun. On March 1, 2017, at 5:00 p.m., WKNL flipped back to classic hits, branded as "100.9 K-Hits". The airstaff from Roxy remained on the station with the change. In February 2021, the station retained morning show host Franco, but opted to go "jockless" for the remainder of the day, as well as on the weekends.  "1980's Flashback weekends" were added to the mix with the station spotlighting one year from the 80's every weekend and host Franco recording multiple factoids which are used to introduce a song from that year.

References

External links

KNL
Radio stations established in 1970
Classic hits radio stations in the United States
1970 establishments in Connecticut